Albatrellus flettii is a species of fungus in the family Albatrellaceae. It was originally described in 1941 by Elizabeth Eaton Morse as Polyporus flettii, but this naming was invalid as it lacked a Latin description. Zdeněk Pouzar transferred it to Albatrellus in 1972. The species is found in western North America, where it grows on the ground in coniferous forests.

References

Russulales
Fungi described in 1941
Fungi of North America